Shivanaga is a 1992 Indian Kannada film,  directed by K. S. R. Das and produced by K. Sukumar. The film stars Arjun Sarja, Malashree, Mukhyamantri Chandru and Doddanna in the lead roles. The film has musical score by Rajan–Nagendra.

Cast

Arjun Sarja
Malashree
Mukhyamantri Chandru
Doddanna
Sundar Krishna Urs
Sudarshan
Mysore Lokesh
Chethan Ramarao
Rajanna
Lakshman
Shanimahadevappa
Rathnakar
Chennayya
Chennanna
Pandari Bai
Umashree
Y. Vijaya
Jayalalithaa

Soundtrack 
Chi. Udaya Shankar wrote the lyrics. 

"Mutthugala Ratnagala" - K. S. Chithra, S. P. Balasubrahmanyam 
"Baaro Nanna" - K. S. Chithra, S. P. Balasubrahmanyam 
"Manmatha Rathriyo - K. S. Chithra, S. P. Balasubrahmanyam 
"Harana Koralalli" - K. S. Chithra
"Ondu Kottare" - K. S. Chithra

References

External links
 
 

1992 films
1990s Kannada-language films
Films directed by K. S. R. Das
Films scored by Rajan–Nagendra
Films about shapeshifting
Hindu devotional films